33 Savaiye (Gurmukhi: ੩੩ ਸਵਈਏ; alternatively transliterated as Swayyae) is a religious work written by Guru Gobind Singh which is included in Dasam Granth, second scripture of Sikhs. It is present after Sabad Patshahi 10 and continued with Khalsa Mahima. It explains qualities of Supreme and Khalsa.

Structure 
 It is situated on page 712 to 716 of Dasam Granth. 
 These are 33 in number, having four stanzas each. 
 These were written at Anandpur Sahib.

See also 

 Savaiya

References

External links 
 33 Savaiye Exegesis on Vimeo
 www.dasamgranth.in: Writings, Audios and Videos on Dasam Granth compositions

Dasam Granth